Torbat-e Heydarieh County (Šahrestâne Torbate Heydarie) is in Razavi Khorasan province, Iran. The capital of the county is the city of Torbat-e Heydarieh. At the 2006 census, the county's population was 261,917, in 67,735 households. The following census in 2011 counted 210,390 people in 60,777 households, by which time Jolgeh Zaveh District had been separated from the county to form Zaveh County. At the 2016 census, Torbat-e Heydarieh County's population was 224,626 in 68,927 households.

Torbat-e Heydarieh County is 1005 km. away from Tehran and in a mountainous region on the skirt of mountains having different weather in different areas. In the past, this city was called Zaveh. According to a narrative in 13th century, Sheikh Haydar, a famous Gnostic, was living there. The change of its name from Zaveh to Torbat-e Heydarieh is related to the life and tomb of this great Gnostic. The existing cultural heritage belongs to Sasanian times and the 13th century: Bazeh Hovar and Robat Sefid temple, Ghotb-e-dinn Haydar, Sheikh Haydar, Sheikh
Abolghasema, and Shoh Senjan tombs.

Administrative divisions

The population history and structural changes of Torbat-e Heydarieh County's administrative divisions over three consecutive censuses are shown in the following table. The latest census shows four districts, eight rural districts, and four cities.

References

 

Counties of Razavi Khorasan Province